Kari River is a river of Sweden. It flows into the Tärendö River.

Rivers of Norrbotten County